The Owls Are Not What They Seem is an album by Swedish folk musician Sofia Talvik. Released in 2012, the album was promoted by Talvik with a 16-month tour of the United States.

Track listing

References

External links
 The Owls Are Not What They Seem by Sofia Talvik on Bandcamp

2012 albums
Sofia Talvik albums